Ana Pombo is an appointed Professor (W3) of Biology at Humboldt University and senior group leader at the Berlin Institute for Medical Systems Biology (BIMSB) at the Max Delbrück Center for Molecular Medicine (MDC) in Berlin-Buch with the focus on "Epigenetic Regulation and Chromatin Architecture". Since May 2018, Pombo is an elected member of the European Molecular Biology Organization (EMBO).

Early education 
From 1988–1992, Pombo did her Bachelor of Science as well as her Master of Science in Biochemistry at the University of Lisbon. In 1998, Pombo graduated with a DPhil (Physiological Sciences) from the Sir William Dunn School of Pathology, University of Oxford, where she described transcription factories in the mammalian nucleus.

Research and career 
From 1998 to 2002, Pombo was a Royal Society Dorothy Hodgkin Fellow at the Sir William Dunn School of Pathology, University of Oxford. In 2000, Pombo started her own research group at the MRC London Institute for Medical Sciences, Imperial College London. From April 2012 till March 2015, she was a full professor (0.2 FTE) in Cell Biology of the Institute of Clinical Sciences (ICS) at the Imperial College London. In 2013, Pombo moved her lab to the BIMSB at the Max Delbrück Center for Molecular Medicine. Her research aims to characterize the interaction between gene regulation and genome architecture, to determine the underlying rules and principles of functional genes.

Awards and honours 
2018: member of the European Molecular Biology Organization (EMBO)
2007: Robert Feulgen Prize, Society for Histochemistry
1998–2002: Royal Society Dorothy Hodgkin Fellowship
1997–2000: Hayward Junior Research Fellowship, Oriel College, Oxford
1994–1997: PhD scholarship, Junta Nacional para a Investigação Científica e Tecnológica

References

External links 
List of Publications from Ana Pombo
Pombo Lab: Epigenetic Regulation and Chromatin Architecture
Video about Pombo's research (DNA folding and gene activity in development and disease)

Year of birth missing (living people)
Living people